The Fourteenth Dynasty of Egypt was a series of rulers reigning during the Second Intermediate Period over the Nile Delta region of Egypt. It lasted between 75 (ca. 1725–1650 BC) and 155 years (ca. 1805–1650 BC), depending on the scholar. The capital of the dynasty was probably Avaris. The 14th Dynasty existed concurrently with the 13th Dynasty based in Memphis. Some of the contested rulers of the 14th Dynasty (proposed by Kim Ryholt) are commonly identified by Egyptologists as being of Canaanite (Semitic) descent, owing to the distinct origins of the names of some of their kings and princes, like Ipqu (West Semitic for "grace"), Yakbim ("ia-ak-bi-im", an Amorite name), Qareh (West Semitic for "the bald one"), or Yaqub-Har. Names in relation with Nubia are also recorded in two cases, king Nehesy ("The Nubian") and queen Tati. However, the dynasty rulers are not referred to as Hyksos in the Turin kings list.

Chronology 
The 14th Dynasty is sometimes combined with the 11th, 12th, and 13th Dynasties in the  Middle Kingdom of Egypt period, though the 14th Dynasty overlaps at least partially with either of (or both of) the 13th Dynasty and the 15th Dynasty. More commonly, the 14th Dynasty is grouped together with the 13th, 15th, 16th, and 17th, as the Second Intermediate Period.

There are enough gaps in the knowledge of the 14th Dynasty that its absolute chronological position is debated, and can vary by as much as 75 years between authorities. Egyptologist Kim Ryholt proposes that the 14th Dynasty emerged during the late 12th Dynasty, ca. 1805 BC, during or shortly after Sobekneferu's rule. He contends that the local Canaanite population residing in the eastern Delta declared their independence and staved off possible attempts from the 13th Dynasty Memphite kings to recover the Delta. According to Ryholt, the 14th Dynasty lasted from 1805 BC until its demise under the Hyksos 15th Dynasty ca. 1650 BC, lasting a total of 155 years.

This hypothesis is not shared by some Egyptologists, such as Manfred Bietak, Daphna Ben Tor, and James and Susan Allen, who argue that the 14th Dynasty could not have emerged before the mid 13th Dynasty, ca. 1720 BC, after the reign of Sobekhotep IV. In particular, they argue that the evidence from the strata levels where 14th Dynasty seals have been discovered conclusively establishes that the 14th Dynasty was only contemporary with the 13th Dynasty in the last half century of the latter's existence, i.e., after ca. 1700 BC. Additionally, Manfred Bietak has dated the inscriptions and monuments of Nehesy, possibly the second ruler of the 14th Dynasty, to around 1700 BC as well.

Following the very short reign of Nehesy, most scholars – including Manfred Bietak and Kim Ryholt – agree that the Delta region was struck by a prolonged famine and perhaps a plague lasting until the end of the 14th Dynasty. The same famine may have affected the 13th Dynasty, which also exhibits instability and numerous ephemeral kings in its last 50 years of existence, from ca. 1700 BC until 1650 BC. The weakened state of both kingdoms may explain, in part, why they fell rapidly to the emerging Hyksos power around 1650 BC.

Seat of power 
The Manethonian tradition credits the 14th Dynasty with as many as 76 kings ruling from Xois rather than Avaris. However, Egyptologist Kim Ryholt notes that the Turin Canon mentions only approximately 56 kings, and does not have enough space to have recorded more than 70. Ryholt also points to excavations at Avaris that revealed the existence of a large royal palace dating to the Second Intermediate Period. One of its courtyards housed a statue of a king or high-ranking official, over twice life-size, and possessing non-Egyptian attributes. For these reasons, Ryholt and most Egyptologists share the view that Avaris – rather than Xois – was the 14th Dynasty's seat of power.

Extent of rule and foreign relations 
The precise borders of the 14th Dynasty state are not known, due to the general scarcity of its monuments. In his study of the Second Intermediate Period, Kim Ryholt concludes that the territory directly controlled by the 14th Dynasty roughly consisted of the Nile Delta, with borders located near Athribis in the western Delta and Bubastis in the east.

Seals attributable to the 14th Dynasty have been found in Middle and Upper Egypt – then entirely the territory of the 13th Dynasty – and as far south as Dongola, beyond the Nile's Third Cataract. To the north, seals have been found in the southern Levant, principally along the Mediterranean coast, even as far north as Tel Kabri (in modern-day northern Israel, near the border with Lebanon). This indicates the existence of important trade conducted between the 13th Dynasty, the Canaanite city-states, and Nubia.  Ryholt further proposes that king Sheshi, whom he sees as a 14th Dynasty ruler, married a Nubian princess, queen Tati, to strengthen relations with the Kushite kingdom.

Rulers
The order of rulers for this dynasty is established by the Turin Royal Canon and is widely accepted – except for the first five rulers, which are given below after Ryholt. The names of these rulers are not given on the Turin Canon (except for perhaps one), and Ryholt proposes that they were mentioned as wsf in the list, which denotes a lacuna in the original document from which the list was copied during the Ramesside period. Rather, Ryholt identifies the first five kings thanks to a seriation of their seals. His conclusions are debated, however, in Ben Tor's study of the strata levels, in which seals attributed to the first five kings have been found. Ben Tor concludes that the reigns of Sheshi, 'Ammu, and Yakbim date to the second half of the Hyksos 15th Dynasty, and are not contemporary with the 13th Dynasty. According to Ben Tor, these kings were most likely minor vassal rulers of the Hyksos kings that ruled over the Nile Delta.

The following rulers are not controversial, being established by the Turin Canon – and, for a few of them, by contemporary sources as well:

Finally, several rulers attested by contemporary artefacts who are otherwise unknown from the Turin Canon could be dated to the 14th or 15th Dynasty. Their identities and chronological position remain unclear:

References

Bibliography

 
States and territories established in the 19th century BC
States and territories disestablished in the 17th century BC
Hyksos
14
17th century BC in Egypt
16th century BC in Egypt
2nd-millennium BC establishments in Egypt
2nd-millennium BC disestablishments in Egypt
14